The following is a list of the current Swedish Hockey League (SHL) team rosters.

Brynäs IF

Djurgårdens IF

Färjestad BK

Frölunda HC

HV71

IK Oskarshamn

Leksands IF

Linköping HC

Luleå HF

Malmö Redhawks

Rögle BK

Skellefteå AIK

Växjö Lakers

Örebro HK

References

 
SHL